Eli Sanders is an American journalist based in Seattle, Washington and the Associate Editor of The Stranger. In 2012, Sanders won the Pulitzer Prize in Feature Writing.
Sanders hosts a weekly political podcast for The Stranger, the Blabbermouth Podcast.

On September 19, 2017, Sanders announced that he would take a temporary leave from The Stranger and work as the deputy communications director to Mayor Tim Burgess until November. Sanders will return to The Stranger to write about his experiences as part of the mayoral transition.

Sanders graduated from Columbia College of Columbia University in 1999.

References

Living people
Pulitzer Prize winners
Year of birth missing (living people)
Columbia College (New York) alumni
American male journalists
American editors